Watts Happening is rap artist Ohmega Watts' second album released on October 9, 2007.

Track listing
 What's It Worth
 Triple Double (featuring Theory Hazit)
 No Delay (featuring Surreal of the Sound Providers)
 Shorty Shouts
 Model Citizen
 Few and Far Between
 Eyes and Ears (featuring Jneiro Jarel, Shape of Broad Minds)
 Roc the Bells (featuring Lightheaded)
 Adaptacao (featuring Tita Lima)
 Saywhayusay
 Are You Satisfied (featuring Sugar Pie DeSanto)
 Dedicated
 Memory Lane (featuring Genahral Victor)
 Found
 Work for Wealth (featuring Ragen Fykes & Barry Hampton of Triple Grip)
 The Platypus Strut
 Freak Out
 Gone with the Wind

2007 albums
Ubiquity Records albums
Ohmega Watts albums